Blinkhorn is an English surname. Notable people with the surname include:

Cec Blinkhorn (1892–1978), Australian professional rugby league footballer
Fred Blinkhorn (1901-1983), English professional association footballer
John Blinkhorn, owner of the Theatre Royal, Gloucester
Matthew Blinkhorn (born 1985), English professional association footballer
 Paul Blinkhorn, British expert in post-Roman pottery who appeared in the TV series Time Team
Robert Blinkhorn ( - 1888), Gloucester businessman
Steve Blinkhorn (born 1949), British occupational psychologist and psychometrician
Thomas Blinkhorn (1806-1856), pioneer farmer on Vancouver Island in British Columbia
Tom Blinkhorn (1903-1976), English professional rugby league footballer

English-language surnames